Naft Masjed Soleyman Football Club (Bashgah-e Futbal-e Naft Masjed Soleyman) (also named Naft M.I.S or Naft MIS) is an Iranian football club based in Masjed-Soleyman, Iran. They currently compete in the Persian Gulf Pro League as they were promoted at the end of 2017–18 season. Naft Masjed-Soleyman is owned by the NISOC.

Behnam Mohammadi Stadium is the club's home stadium and underwent renovations in 2014 to meet Persian Gulf Pro League standards.

History

Establishment
When oil was discovered in Masjed Soleyman, there was a rush of workers to the city. The Team was established in 1965 as F.C. Corona Masjed-Soleyman and was composed of Persian, British and Armenian engineers working for the National Iranian Oil Company. The team garnished it first taste of victory in 1973 when it won the Khuzestan Provincial Cup. Before the revolution the most popular team in the city was Taj Masjed Soleyman. After the revolution Taj was dissolved and Naft became the most popular team in Masjed Soleyman.

Lower leagues
Naft was promoted to the Azadegan League in 2010 after a successful season in the 2nd Division. In the 2013–14 season Naft Masjed Soleyman finished first in the table with 12 wins and 7 draws and were promoted to the Persian Gulf Pro League. Naft Masjed Soleyman became the first team from the city of Masjed Soleyman to compete in the best league of Iran.

Persian Gulf Pro League

Before the start of the season, the National Iranian Oil Company improved the Behnam Mohammadi Stadium to meet 2014–15 Persian Gulf Pro League conditions. In their Persian Gulf Pro League (PGPL) match Naft tied 0–0 against Saipa. Naft won its first ever PGPL match in a 2–1 victory against Foolad on 3 October 2014. At the end of the season Naft finished last in the league and was relegated to the Azadegan League.

Naft Masjed Soleyman made it back to the Persian Gulf Pro League in April 2018 after finishing as champions of the Azadegan League.

Season-by-season
The table below chronicles the achievements of Naft Masjed-Soleyman  in various competitions since 2009.

Players

For recent transfers, see List of Iranian football transfers summer 2022.

Current managerial staff

Achievements

 Azadegan League:
Winners (1): 2017–18
Runners-up (1): 2013–14
 Second Division:
Runners-up (1): 2009–10

See also
Sanat Naft Abadan F.C.
Naft Tehran F.C.
Naft Gachsaran F.C.
Sanat Naft Novin Abadan F.C.
Naft Ghaemshahr F.C.
Naft Mahmoudabad F.C.
Naft Omidiyeh F.C.
Persian Gulf Pro League

References

External links
 Official Website
 Players

 
Football clubs in Iran
Association football clubs established in 1965
1965 establishments in Iran